The 605.2 megawatt (MW) Peñascal Wind Farm project is located south of Baffin Bay in Kenedy County, Texas and was constructed in three phases by Iberdrola and Mortenson Construction.  It became Iberdrola's largest renewable energy facility in the world after completion of the second phase in 2010.

Details

The first two construction phases of the wind farm each have 84 Mitsubishi MWT-92 2.4 MW wind turbines.  Around 200 people were involved in the construction.   Phase I was completed in April 2009 and Phase II came online in April 2010.

The facility also created some 20 long-term jobs in maintenance and operation. Iberdrola received a $114 million treasury grant for the project as part of the stimulus funds that was released in September 2009.  On July 30, 2010, the U.S. Treasury's 1603 Program website listed the Penascal II Wind Project as having received a total award amount of $222,861,149.

Phase three of the project consists of 101 Gamesa G97 2.0 MW wind turbines.  Construction began in 2013 and was completed in 2015.

The wind farm includes an innovative radar system that detects the arrival of large flocks of migratory birds and shuts down the turbines if visibility conditions present a danger.

Electricity production

(*)   partial year of operation

See also

Wind power in Texas
Environmental impact of wind power
List of wind farms in the United States

References

External links
 Penascal Wind Power Project, Fact Sheet
 Penascal Baffin Wind Power Project, Fact Sheet
 VIDEO: Peñascal, Texas Wind Power Project

Energy infrastructure completed in 2009
Energy infrastructure completed in 2010
Energy infrastructure completed in 2015
Buildings and structures in Kenedy County, Texas
Wind farms in Texas